Gaspare Spontini (1774–1851) wrote operas from the last decade of the 18th century to the third decade of the 19th century.

Before leaving Italy, where he was born, he wrote:
Li puntigli delle donne
Adelina Senese o sia l'Amore secreto
Il finto pittore

Il Teseo riconosciuto
La finta filosofa
La fuga in maschera
I quadri parlanti
Gli Elisi delusi
Gli amanti in cimento, o sia Il geloso audace
Le metamorfosi di Pasquale, o sia Tutto è illusione nel mondo

For Paris, he wrote:
La petite maison
Milton
Julie, ou Le pot de fleurs
La vestale
Fernand Cortez, ou La conquête du Mexique
Pélage, ou Le roi et la paix
Les dieux rivaux, ou Les fêtes de Cythère
Olimpie

First presented in Berlin:
Nurmahal, oder das Rosenfest von Caschmir 
Alcidor
Agnes von Hohenstaufen

References

Sources

Gerhard, Anselm (1992), "Spontini, Gaspare" in The New Grove Dictionary of Opera, ed. Stanley Sadie (London) 
Some of the information in this article is taken from the related Dutch Wikipedia article.

External links
 ESDF-Opera: details of Spontini premieres

 
Lists of operas by composer
Lists of compositions by composer